John Howard Goldwyn (born August 10, 1958) is an American film producer.

Biography
Goldwyn was born on August 10, 1958, in Los Angeles, California, the son of producer Samuel Goldwyn Jr., and his wife, film and stage actress Jennifer Howard. He has two brothers: film director and actor Tony Goldwyn and Francis Goldwyn. Goldwyn has produced a total of eight films, according to the Internet Movie Database, and the television series Dexter.

His paternal grandparents were Oscar-winning producer Samuel Goldwyn and actress Frances Howard.  His maternal grandparents were Sidney Howard, screenwriter of Gone with the Wind and 70 other films, and Clare Eames, an actress. Goldwyn and his former wife Colleen Camp have one daughter, Emily Goldwyn, who appeared in the 2005 film Elizabethtown as Star Basketball Player. On April 30, 2011, Goldwyn and hotelier Jeffrey Michael Klein celebrated their life partnership in a ceremony in Marshall, California. Goldwyn's daughter Emily led the couple in the exchange of vows and rings.

Goldwyn was an Executive Producer/Consultant for scripted content at Discovery Channel. In September 2016, Discovery aired the limited series Harley & The Davidsons, which Goldwyn produced in association with RAW UK. He then produced Manhunt: Unabomber, the first installment of Discovery's master criminal anthology series. In 2017, he signed a first look deal with Lionsgate.

John Goldwyn's most recent credits include the Hulu miniseries Dopesick released in October of 2021 and the revival of Dexter, set to be released in November of 2021.

Filmography
He was a producer in all films unless otherwise noted.

Film

Thanks

Television

References

External links
 
 

1958 births
American film producers
Living people
Businesspeople from Los Angeles
American film studio executives
American people of Polish-Jewish descent
LGBT producers
Bisexual men
LGBT people from California
Film producers from California
John